Omar Hernandez may refer to:

Omar Hernández (born 1962), Colombian cyclist
Omar Hernandez (soccer) (born 2001), American soccer player